Baddeley Edge is a small hamlet in Stoke-on-Trent. Baddeley Edge is part of the Abbey Green ward, which covers the areas of Baddeley Green, Milton, Abbey Hulton and Light Oaks. Located in the hamlet is a Primitive Methodist Chapel which was built in 1874.

References

Villages in Staffordshire